The 1979–80 Scottish Second Division was won by Falkirk who, along with second placed East Stirlingshire, were promoted to the First Division. Alloa Athletic finished bottom.

Table

References 

Scottish Second Division seasons
3
Scot